Rebecca Frecknall is a British theatre director best known for directing the 2021 West End revival of Cabaret starring Eddie Redmayne and Jessie Buckley. The production won the 2022 Olivier Award for Best Revival of a Musical and Frecknall won both the Olivier Award and Critics' Circle Award for Best Director. She is also Associate Director at the Almeida Theatre where she directed Summer & Smoke, Three Sisters and The Duchess of Malfi. Her direction of Summer & Smoke first brought her critical acclaim and showcased her ability to re-invent old works in new ways. The production won the Laurence Olivier Award for Best Revival of a Play in 2019, with Frecknall also nominated for the Sir Peter Hall Award for Best Director. In 2023 she was listed by The Stage as the 13th most influential person in theatre.

Background 
Frecknall grew up in Cambridgeshire, the middle of three daughters. She read Drama and Theatre Arts at Goldsmiths, University of London, before participating in the directors course at LAMDA. Her love of theatre was inspired by her late father, to whom she dedicated her 2022 Laurence Olivier Award.

Directing credits

Awards and nominations

References

External links 
 Agent's website

English theatre directors
1986 births
Living people
Women theatre directors
Laurence Olivier Award winners
Drama Desk Award winners
Critics' Circle Theatre Award winners